Today's Sounds is a live album by The Three Sounds which was recorded at the London House in Chicago in 1966 and released on the Limelight label.

Reception

Allmusic's Ken Dryden noted, "The group's brief sojourn onto the label marked a turn to a more rock and pop influence in their repertoire, as is evident in many of the poor choices for this live recording, made at the London House in Chicago in early 1966. ... Most fans will likely prefer the Three Sounds' earlier Blue Note releases or Harris' many outstanding quartet recordings during his long association with Concord ".

Track listing
All compositions by Gene Harris except where noted
 "Downtown" (Tony Hatch) − 3:12
 "Gee, Baby, Ain't I Good to You" (Andy Razaf, Don Redman) − 5:00
 "The Way I Feel" − 4:18
 "The Good Life" (Sacha Distel, Jack Reardon) − 4:50
 "Mohair Sam" (Dallas Frazier) − 2:03
 "Simple Simon" − 3:15
 "A.M. Blues" (Ray Brown) − 4:53
 "Old Folks" (Dedette Lee Hill, Willard Robison) − 7:32
 "Goodnight Ladies" (Edwin Pearce Christy) − 4:13

Personnel
Gene Harris − piano
Andy Simpkins − bass
Kalil Madi − drums

References

1966 live albums
The Three Sounds live albums
Limelight Records live albums
Albums recorded at The London House, Chicago